The She people (Cantonese: ,) are an ethnic group in China. They form one of the 56 ethnic groups officially recognized by the People's Republic of China.

The She are the largest ethnic minority in Fujian, Zhejiang, and Jiangxi Provinces. They are also present in the provinces of Anhui and Guangdong. Some descendants of the She also exist amongst the Hakka minority in Taiwan.

Languages 
Today, over 400,000 She people of Fujian, Zhejiang, and Jiangxi provinces speak Shehua, an unclassified Chinese variety that has been heavily influenced by Hakka Chinese.

There are approximately 1,200 She people in Guangdong province who speak a Hmong–Mien language called She, also called Ho Ne meaning "mountain people". Some said they were descendants of Dongyi, Nanman or Yue peoples.

Shehua and Sheyu speakers have separate histories and identities, although both are officially classified by the Chinese government as She people. The Dongjia of Majiang County, Guizhou are also officially classified as She people, but speak a Western Hmongic language closely related to Chong'anjiang Miao.

History 
The She people are some of the earliest known settlers of Guangdong; they are thought to have originally settled along the shallow shore for easier fishing access during the Neolithic era. Eventually, after an influx of Yuet people moved south during the Warring States period, serious competition between the two peoples for resources developed.

From the time of the Qin dynasty on, waves of migrants from northern China have had a serious impact on the She people. Because they possessed superior tools and technology, these migrants were able to displace the She and occupy the better land for farming. As a result of this, some of the She were forced to relocate into the hilly areas of the Jiangxi and Fujian provinces.

Following this relocation, the She people became hillside farmers.  Their methods of farming included burning grasses on the slope, casting rice seeds on those embers and then harvesting the produce following the growth season. Some of the She people also participated in the production and trade of salt, obtained from the evaporation of local pools of salt water.

Many conflicts took place between the Han Chinese and She peoples.  For example, in one incident, She salt producers on Lantau Island in Hong Kong attacked the city of Canton in a revolt during the Song dynasty.

During the Ming-Qing dynasties they moved into and settled Zhejiang's southern region and mountain districts in the Lower Yangtze region, after they left their homeland in Northern Fujian. It is theorized that the She were pushed out of their land by the Hakka, which caused them to move into Zhejiang.

PRC Autonomous Counties and Ethnic Townships

Zhejiang

Hangzhou 
 Eshan She Ethnic Township in Tonglu County

Quzhou 
 Muchen She Ethnic Township in Longyou County

Jinhua 
 Shuiting She Ethnic Township in Lanxi City
 Liucheng She Ethnic Town in Wuyi County

Wenzhou 
 Qingjie She Ethnic Township in Pingyang County
 Xikeng She Ethnic Town in Wencheng County
 Zhoushan She Ethnic Township in Wencheng County
 Fengyang She Ethnic Township in Cangnan County
 Dailing She Ethnic Township in Cangnan County
 Siqian She Ethnic Town in Taishun County
 Zhuli She Ethnic Township in Taishun County

Lishui 
 Jingning She Autonomous County
 Laozhu She Ethnic Town in Liandu District
 Lixin She Ethnic Township in Liandu District
 Wuxi She Ethnic Township in Yunhe County
 Anxi She Ethnic Township in Yunhe County
 Zhuyang She Ethnic Township in Longquan City
 Sanren She Ethnic Township in Suichang County
 Banqiao She Ethnic Township in Songyang County

Anhui

Xuancheng 
 Yunti She Ethnic Township in Ningguo City

Fujian

Fuzhou 
 Xiaocang She Ethnic Township in Lianjiang County
 Huoko She Ethnic Township in Luoyuan County

Ningde 
 Muyun She Ethnic Township in Fu'an City
 Kangcuo She Ethnic Township in Fu'an City
 Banzhong She Ethnic Township in Fu'an City
 Xiamen She Ethnic Township in Fuding City
 Yantian She Ethnic Township in Xiapu County
 Shuimen She Ethnic Township in Xiapu County
 Chongru She Ethnic Township in Xiapu County

Zhangzhou 
 Longjiao She Ethnic Township in Longhai City
 Huxi She Ethnic Township in Zhangpu County
 Chiling She Ethnic Township in Zhangpu County

Nanping 
ShunChang County

Quanzhou 
Dehua County

Longyan 
 Gongzhuang She Ethnic Township in Shanghang County
 Lufeng She Ethnic Township in Shanghang County

Jiangxi

Shangrao 
 Taiyuan She Ethnic Township in Yanshan County
 Huangbi She Ethnic Township in Yanshan County

Yingtan 
 Zhangping She Ethnic Township in Guixi City

Fuzhou 
 Jinzhu She Ethnic Township in Le'an County

Ganzhou 
 Chitu She Ethnic Township in Nankang City

Ji'an 
 Donggu She Ethnic Township in Qingyuan District
 Longgang She Ethnic Township in Yongfeng County
 Jinping Ethnic Township in Xiajiang County

Guangdong

Guangzhou 
 Zengcheng

Heyuan 
 Zhangxi She Ethnic Township in Dongyuan County

Distribution of She people in China 

The roughly 45,000 She living in Guizhou Province form a separate subgroup, the Dongjia, who differ notably in culture from the She in other areas.

Provincial level 
In a 2000 census, 709,592 She have been counted in China.
Distribution of She people in China

District level 
Distribution of She people by district (as of 2000)

Only values of 0.5% and greater have been considered.

Notes and references 
 

 www.zgshezu.com/ {畲族网工作室}

External links 
 Official Website of Jingning She Autonomous County
 She Nationality
 The She ethnic minority
 Chinese Nationalities (She Minority)
 畲族网

Ethnic groups in Fujian
Zhejiang